Valeri Nikolayevich Sarmont (born 28 January 1992) is a Russian former football player.

Club career
He made his debut in the Russian Football National League for FC Baltika Kaliningrad on 31 August 2015 in a game against FC Sibir Novosibirsk.

References

External links
 Profile by Russian Football National League

1992 births
People from Kamianske
Living people
Russian footballers
Association football defenders
Russian expatriate footballers
Expatriate footballers in Poland
FC Baltika Kaliningrad players